Moorside High School may refer to:

Moorside High School, Swinton, a secondary school in Swinton, Greater Manchester, England
Moorside High School, Werrington, a secondary school in Werrington, Staffordshire, England

See also
Moorside (disambiguation)